Joyce is an Irish and French given name and surname. It is derived from the Old French masculine name Josse, which derived from the Latin name Iudocus, the Latinized form of the Breton name Judoc meaning "lord". The name became rare after the 14th century, but was later revived as a female given name, which derived from the Middle English  meaning "weird crazy lady". 

The name originated with Saint Joyce (Judoc) (600–668), a Breton prince and hermit and the son of Judicael, king of Brittany.

As a first name

Art

 Joyce Anderson (1923–2014), American furniture designer and woodworker
 Joyce Anderson (artist) (1932–2022), Canadian painter and art teacher
Joyce Ballantyne (1918–2006), American painter of pin-ups
Joyce Dennys (1893–1991), English cartoonist, illustrator and painter
Joyce Wieland (1931–1998), Canadian experimental filmmaker and mixed media artist

Business
Joyce Chen (1917–1994), chef and restaurateur
Joyce Hall (1891–1982), American businessman and founder of Hallmark Cards
Joyce Kiage, businesswoman from Papua New Guinea
Joyce Nicholson (1919-2011), Australian author and businesswoman

Film, television, and theater
Joyce Blair (1932–2006), British actress and dancer
Dr. Joyce Brothers (1927–2013), TV personality
Joyce Bulifant (born 1937), American actress
Joyce Carey (1898–1993), British actress
Joyce Chopra (born 1938), American film director
Joyce Coad (1917–1987), American child actress
Joyce Compton (1907–1997), American actress
Joyce DeWitt (born 1949), American actress best known for her role in Three's Company
Joyce Giraud (born 1975), Puerto Rican actress and model
Joyce Godenzi (born 1965), beauty queen and actress of Chinese and Australian descent
Joyce Gordon (1929–2020), American actress and union representative
Joyce Grenfell (1910–1979), British actress, comedian and singer-songwriter
Joyce Hyser (born 1957), American actress
Joyce Jacobs (born 1922), British character actress
Joyce Jimenez (born 1978), Filipino American actress
Joyce MacKenzie (1925–2021), American actress
Joyce Nizzari (born 1940), American model and actress
Joyce Randolph (born 1925), American actress
Joyce Redman (born 1918), British actress
Joyce Sparer Adler (1916–1999), American critic, playwright, and teacher
Joyce Van Patten (born 1934), American actress

Literature and print
Joyce Cary (1888–1957), Irish novelist
Joyce Cavalcante (born 1949), Brazilian novelist
Joyce Brabner (born 1952), writer of political comics
Joyce Dyer (born 1947), American scholar and writer
Joyce Hawkins (died 1992), English lexicographer and dictionary editor
Joyce Jillson (1946–2004), American astrologer, actress, and author
Joyce Johnson (author) (born 1935), American author
Alfred Joyce Kilmer (1886–1918), American poet
Joyce Lussu (1912–1998), Italian writer, translator, and partisan
Joyce Mansour (1928–1986), British-Egyptian surrealist poet
Joyce Maynard (born 1953), American writer
Joyce Carol Oates (born 1938), American novelist
Joyce Carol Thomas (born 1938), African American playwright, illustrator, and author of children's books

Music
Joyce Auguste, Saint Lucian musician and leader of The Hewanorra Voices
Joyce Blackham (1934–2018), British opera singer
Joyce Cooling, American smooth jazz guitarist
Joyce Chu, Malaysian singer
Joyce DiDonato (born 1969), American opera singer
Joyce Hatto (1928–2006), faux British pianist
Joyce Kennedy, American singer with the funk rock band Mother's Finest
Joyce Moreno (musician) (born 1948), Brazilian singer-songwriter, formerly known as Joyce
Joyce Paul (1937–2016), American country music singer
Joyce Sims (born 1959), American singer-songwriter and pianist
Joyce Wright (born 1922), British opera singer and actress
Joyce Yang (born 1986), Korean pianist
Joyce Zhao Hong Qiao (born 1979), Taiwanese actress and member of music group 7 Flowers

Politics
Joyce Anelay, Baroness Anelay of St Johns (born 1947), Conservative member of the House of Lords
Joyce Banda (born 1951), Malawian Member of Parliament
Joyce Baird (1929–2015), British trade unionist
Joyce Beatty (born 1950), American politician, member of the Ohio House of Representatives
Joyce Butler (1910–1992), British Labour Co-operative politician
Joyce Cusack (born 1942), American politician, member of the Florida House of Representatives
Joyce Fairbairn (born 1939), Canadian Senator and first woman Leader of the Government in the Senate
Joyce Gemayel, wife of former President of Lebanon Amin Gemayel and mother of the assassinated politician Pierre Amine Gemayel
Joyce Henry, American politician, member of the Minnesota House of Representatives
Joyce Hens Green (born 1928), American district court judge
Joyce Karlin Fahey (born 1951), Venezuela-born American prosecutor, Los Angeles County Superior Court judge, and two-term mayor of Manhattan Beach, California
Joyce L. Kennard (born 1941), American judge, associate justice of the California Supreme Court
Joyce Mojonnier (born 1943), American politician, California Assemblywoman from 1983 to 1991
Joyce Mujuru (born 1956), Zimbabwean politician, co-vice-president of the Zanu-PF party
Joyce Quin, Baroness Quin (born 1944), British Labour Party politician
Joyce Elaine Roop (1952–1995), American attorney and environmental activist
Joyce Savoline (born 1946), Canadian politician
Joyce Steele (born 1910), Australian politician and the first woman elected to the Parliament of South Australia
Joyce Trimmer (born 1927), Canadian politician
Joyce Watson (born 1955), Welsh Labour Party politician and Member of the National Assembly for Wales

Sports
Joyce Barry (1919–1999), Australian cyclist
Joyce Chepchumba (born 1970), Kenyan long-distance runner
Joyce King (born 1927), Australian sprinter
Joyce Moreno (footballer) (born 1974), Panamanian-Spanish footballer
Joyce Slipp (born 1950), Canadian basketball player and coach
Joyce Walker (born ca. 1961), American basketball player (Harlem Globetrotters) and coach
Joyce Wethered (1901–1997), British golfer
Joyce Ziske (born 1935), American golfer

Other
Joyce Baird (diabetologist) (1929–2014), Scottish diabetes clinician and academic researcher
Joyce Bishop (1896–1993), English educator
Joyce Chiang (1970–1999), Taiwanese-American murdered in Washington, D.C.
Joyce Echaquan (1982/83–2020), Atikamekw woman
Joyce Gemayel, spouse of former Lebanese President Amine Gemayel
Joyce Giraud (born 1975), Miss Universe 1998
Joyce Ladner (born 1943), American sociologist and author
Joyce Lambert (1917–2005), botanist 
Joyce Marcus, American archaeologist
Joyce Meyer (born 1943), Christian Evangelical author and speaker
Joyce Ohajah, British journalist and news anchor
Joyce Piliso-Seroke (born 1933), South African educator, activist, and community organizer
Joyce K. Reynolds, computer science professor
Joyce Robinson (1925–2013), Jamaican public servant
Joyce Snell (born 1930), British statistician
Joyce Ann Tyldesely, British archaeologist, academic, and freelance writer
Joyce Waley-Cohen (1920–2013), English educationist and public servant
Joyce Winifred Vickery (1908–1979), Australian botanist

As a last name

Business
Alan Joyce (born 1966), Irish-Australian Qantas CEO
David Joyce (1825–1904), American lumber baron and industrialist
Morton Dean Joyce (1900–1989), of New York City
Patrick H. Joyce (1879–1946), American railroad executive
Ron Joyce (1930-2019), Canadian billionaire and co-founder of Tim Horton's donut chain

Film, television, and theatre
Alice Joyce (1890–1955), American actress
Brenda Joyce (actress) (1912–2009), American actress
Elaine Joyce (born 1945), American actress
Ella Joyce (born 1954), American actress
Emily Joyce (born 1969), British actress
Natalie Joyce (1902–1992), American film actress
Peggy Hopkins Joyce (1893–1957), American actress
Yootha Joyce (1927–1980), British actress

Literature and print
Brenda Joyce (author) (born c.1963), American author
Graham Joyce, British science fiction writer
James Joyce (1882–1941), Irish novelist
John A. Joyce (1842–1915), American military officer, poet and writer
Michael Joyce (born 1945), American author and professor of English
Patrick Weston Joyce (1827–1914), Irish author and brother of Robert Dwyer Joyce
Rachel Joyce (born 1962), English novelist and radio playwright
Robert Dwyer Joyce (1830–1883), Irish poet
Stanislaus Joyce (1884–1955), Irish illustrator

Music
Archibald Joyce, British composer (1873–1963)
Bradley Joyce, American songwriter (born 1968)
Don Joyce (musician) (1994–2015), member of the experimental music group Negativland
Eileen Joyce (1912–1991), Australian pianist
Mike Joyce (born 1963), British drummer with The Smiths

Politics
Barnaby Joyce (born 1967), Australian politician
Brian A. Joyce (1962-2018), Democratic Senator from Massachusetts
Charles Herbert Joyce (1830–1916), U.S. Representative from Vermont
Eric Joyce (born 1960), British politician and member of Parliament
George Joyce (1618–1670?), agitator in the English Civil War
Janet J. Joyce (1940-2015), Illinois state senator
Jeremiah E. Joyce (born 1943), Illinois state senator
Jerome J. Joyce (born 1939), Illinois state senator
John Joyce (New Zealand politician) (1839–1899), New Zealand politician
Kevin Joyce (politician), Illinois State Representative
Steven Joyce (born 1963), New Zealand politician
William Joyce (1906–1946), Anglo-Irish Nazi propagandist (known as "Lord Haw-haw")

Religion
Gilbert Cunningham Joyce (1866–1942), educator and Bishop of Monmouth
Isaac Wilson Joyce (1836–1905), American bishop in the Methodist Episcopal Church
Jeremiah Joyce (1763–1816), Unitarian minister and writer

Sports
Alan Joyce (born 1942), Australian footballer
Bill Joyce (1887–?), Scottish footballer
Bill Joyce (baseball) (1865–1941), American baseball player
Bob Joyce (born 1966), Canadian ice hockey player
Cecelia Joyce (born 1983), Irish cricketer
Darragh Joyce (born 1997), Australian rules footballer
Dominick Joyce (born 1981), Irish cricketer
Don Joyce (American football) (born 1929), American football player
Ed Joyce (born 1978), Irish cricketer
Gus Joyce (born 1974), Irish cricketer
Isobel Joyce (born 1983), Irish cricketer
Jim Joyce (born 1955), Major League Baseball umpire
Joan Joyce (born 1940), softball icon, among other sports
Joe Joyce (born 1961), English footballer
Joe Joyce (born 1985), British boxer
John Joyce (footballer) (1877–1956), English goalkeeper, known as "Tiny"
Kaelan Joyce (born 1982), Gibraltarian amateur boxer
Kara Lynn Joyce (born 1985), American swimmer
Leilani Joyce (born 1974), professional squash player from New Zealand
Luke Joyce (born 1987), American soccer player for Carlisle United F.C.
Mark Joyce (born 1983), English snooker player
Matt Joyce (1972), American football player
Matt Joyce (1984), Major League Baseball outfielder
Michael Joyce (tennis player) (born 1973), American tennis player
Pádraic Joyce (born 1977) Irish Gaelic football player for County Galway
Rachel Joyce (born 1978), British triathlete
Regina Joyce (born 1957), Irish long-distance runner
Sean William Joyce (born 1967), English footballer
Warren Joyce (born 1965), English footballer

Other
Ernest Joyce (RNZAF officer) (1920–1944), New Zealand flying ace of the Second World War
Gerald Joyce (born 1956), American scientist
Kenyon A. Joyce, a U.S. Army officer during World War II.
Kerry Joyce, American interior designer
Lucia Joyce (1907–1982), ballet dancer and daughter of writer James Joyce
Maolra Seoighe (Myles Joyce), Irishman executed by British authorities
Nan Joyce (born 1940), Irish Travellers' right activist
Philip Michael Joyce (1920–1942), U.S. Navy ensign for whom the U.S. destroyer escort USS Joyce (DE-317) is named
Rosemary Joyce, American anthropologist
Thomas Athol Joyce (1878−1942), British anthropologist
Seoighe Inish Bearachain, Irish rowing champions

Fictional characters
Joyce Barry, character in The Prisoner
Joyce Barnaby, character in  Midsomer Murders  (TV Series 1997– )
Joyce Benson, character in the 1970s comedy Angie
Joyce Byers, character in Stranger Things
Joyce Davenport, character in Hill Street Blues
Joyce Hayward, eponymous heroine of Joyce, an 1888 novel by Margaret Oliphant
Joyce Kinney, character in Family Guy
Joyce Summers, character in Buffy the Vampire Slayer
Gilda Joyce, character in the Gilda Joyce mystery novels

See also
 Joyce Country, a region of counties Galway in Ireland in which the Joyce family name is common.

References

Given names
Surnames
English feminine given names
English unisex given names
English-language unisex given names
English-language surnames
Surnames from given names